Samuel Bruce Graves Jr. (born November 7, 1963) is an American politician serving as the United States representative for , serving since 2001. He is a member of the Republican Party. The district stretches across most of the northern third of the state, from the Kansas border to the Illinois border. The bulk of its population lives in the northern part of the Kansas City area, including the northern fourth of Kansas City. Graves is the dean of Missouri's House delegation.

Early life, education and career
Graves is a lifelong resident of Tarkio, a small city in Missouri's northwestern corner, not far from the Iowa and Nebraska borders. He is the son of Janice A. (née Hord) and Samuel Bruce Graves. He graduated from the University of Missouri College of Agriculture with a degree in agronomy. He was a member of the Alpha Gamma Sigma fraternity.

Personal life
Graves is a general aviation pilot. He owns a Piper PA-11 Cub Special, is restoring a Beech AT-10, and co-owns a North American T-6 Texan and a Vultee BT-13 Valiant. Gould Peterson Municipal Airport is named after his uncle, an aviator, and is on his family's farm. Graves is a Baptist.

Missouri legislature
Graves was elected to the Missouri House of Representatives in 1992. After one term, he was elected to the Missouri Senate in 1994 and reelected in 1998.

U.S. House of Representatives

Committee assignments
 United States House Committee on Armed Services
 United States House Armed Services Subcommittee on Intelligence, Emerging Threats, and Capabilities
 United States House Committee on Transportation and Infrastructure (Chair)

Caucus memberships
 Congressional Cement Caucus

Political positions

Financial bailouts
After the September 2008 economic crisis, Graves voted against the proposed bailout of United States financial system, claiming it "neither 'punished the wrongdoers nor adequately protected the innocent taxpayers, investors and retirees' caught in the Wall Street banking crisis." In January 2014, Graves introduced the TRICARE Family Improvement Act. The bill would allow dependents of military members to stay on their parents' TRICARE health plan after turning age 26. The bill would change current law, which requires those dependents to change to a separate health plan after turning 26. The American Conservative Union gave him an 85% evaluation in 2017. As of 2019, Graves has a 4% lifetime score from the League of Conservation Voters.

Todd Graves controversy
Graves is the brother of Todd Graves, former U.S. Attorney for the Western District of Missouri. In October 2008, U.S. Senator Kit Bond apologized to Todd Graves after a U.S. Justice Department report cited Bond forcing Graves out over a disagreement with Representative Graves. Following the report, U.S. Attorney General Michael Mukasey appointed a special prosecutor to investigate whether former U.S. Attorney General Alberto Gonzales and other officials involved in the firings of nine U.S. attorneys broke the law (dismissal of U.S. attorneys controversy).

Ethics investigation
In 2009, the House Ethics Committee began an inquiry into whether Graves used his position on the Small Business Committee to invite Brooks Hurst, a longtime friend and a business partner of his wife, to testify at a committee hearing on the federal regulation of biodiesel and ethanol production. Graves had failed to mention the financial link between his wife and Hurst at the hearing, which dealt with federal subsidies for renewable fuels. A review by the independent Office of Congressional Ethics found "substantial reason to believe that an appearance of conflict of interest was created." Graves said in a statement, "I look forward to a quick review of the facts and answering any questions that the committee may have. I believe that a speedy review will show that all the rules of the House concerning testimony in front of the Small Business Committee were followed." The Office of Congressional Ethics referred the case to the House Ethics committee, which ended its own investigation in October, and released a report finding no ethical violations, as it asserted there was no standard in place for appearances like Hurst's.

Political campaigns
Before his congressional career, Graves served eight years in the Missouri General Assembly, winning election to the Missouri House of Representatives once, and to the Missouri Senate twice.

In 2000, Democratic U.S. Representative Pat Danner suddenly retired due to breast cancer. Graves filed within the short period of time left for filing. He faced Danner's son, Steve Danner, a former state senator, in the general election. Graves called Danner as a "tax and spend liberal" and won the race with 51% of the vote, largely by running up huge margins in the district's rural areas. He was arguably helped by George W. Bush carrying the district in the 2000 presidential election, a theory known as the coattail effect.

1992

1994

1998

2000

2002

2004

2006

2008

Graves faced a tougher reelection race in 2008 against the Democratic nominee, former Kansas City Mayor Kay Barnes. He gained national attention early in the race for running an ad accusing Barnes of promoting "San Francisco values." It was initially considered one of the most competitive races in the country, but Graves was reelected handily, with 59% of the vote to Barnes's 37%.

2010

2012

2014

2016

2018

2020

References

External links

 Congressman Sam Graves official U.S. House website
 Sam Graves for Congress
 
 
 

|-

|-

|-

|-

|-

|-

|-

1963 births
20th-century American politicians
21st-century American politicians
Baptists from Missouri
Baptists from the United States
Living people
Republican Party members of the Missouri House of Representatives
Republican Party Missouri state senators
People from Tarkio, Missouri
Republican Party members of the United States House of Representatives from Missouri
University of Missouri alumni